Delta is a census-designated place and unincorporated community in Clay County, Alabama, United States. Its population was 260 as of the 2020 census.

Geography

Climate
The climate in Delta is characterized by hot, humid summers and generally mild to cool winters.  According to the Köppen Climate Classification system, this area has a humid subtropical climate, abbreviated "Cfa" on climate maps.

Demographics

Notable people
 LaFayette L. Patterson, United States Representative born in Delta

References 

Census-designated places in Alabama
Census-designated places in Clay County, Alabama
Unincorporated communities in Alabama
Unincorporated communities in Clay County, Alabama